Benjamin Mark Seymour (born 16 April 1999) is an English professional footballer who plays as a forward for  club Plymouth Parkway.

Career
In April 2017, after progressing through Exeter City's academy, Seymour signed his first professional contract with the club. On 18 July 2017, Seymour signed for National League South club Weston-super-Mare on loan. Seymour made eight appearances for Weston-super-Mare, joining Southern League West club Bideford at the culmination of his loan with Weston-super-Mare. At Bideford, Seymour scored 21 league goals in 33 games during the 2017–18 season. Ahead of the 2018–19 season, Seymour returned to the National League South, signing for Gloucester City on loan. After one goal in twelve appearances for the club, Seymour joined Southern League club Dorchester Town on loan, scoring 14 goals in 26 games in the remainder of the season for the club. On 13 August 2019, Seymour made his professional debut for Exeter, starting in a 4–1 EFL Cup loss against Coventry City. He then made his league debut as a late substitute in a 2–2 draw against Leyton Orient. He scored his first goal for Exeter in an EFL Trophy tie against Swindon Town on 6 October 2020.

On 30 September 2021, Seymour along with Jordan Dyer joined National League club Yeovil Town on a one-month loan deal.

On 21 January 2022, Seymour joined National League South side Bath City on loan for the remainder of the 2021–22 season. Following Exeter's promotion at the end of the 2021–22 season, Seymour was released by the club.

Following his release from Exeter City, Seymour signed for Southern League Premier Division South side Plymouth Parkway.

Career statistics

References

1999 births
Living people
Sportspeople from Watford
Association football forwards
English footballers
Exeter City F.C. players
Weston-super-Mare A.F.C. players
Bideford A.F.C. players
Gloucester City A.F.C. players
Dorchester Town F.C. players
Yeovil Town F.C. players
Bath City F.C. players
Plymouth Parkway F.C. players
English Football League players
National League (English football) players
Southern Football League players